Joint All-Domain Command and Control or JADC2 is the concept that the Department of Defense has developed to connect sensors from all branches of the armed forces into a § unified network powered by artificial intelligence. These branches include the Air Force, Army, Marine Corps, and Navy, as well as Space Force.

Each military branch has its initiative that contributes to JADC2; the Army has Project Convergence, the Navy has Project Overmatch, and the Air Force has the Advanced Battle Management System, also known as ABMS. The Space Force has the Space Development Agency's National Defense Space Architecture (NDSA).

Experimentation 

The DoD has held at least two critical JADC2 exercises. The first one, which took place in Florida in December 2019, centered on a simulated threat posed by cruise missiles. This was the very first demonstration of ABMS, which took place during the exercise. Air Force and Navy aircraft (including F-22 and F-35 fighter jets), a Navy destroyer, an Army Sentinel radar system, a mobile artillery system, as well as commercial space and ground sensors demonstrated their ability to collect, analyze, and share data in real-time to provide a more comprehensive picture of the operating environment. For more information, see  JADC2 at the Army's Project Convergence experiments

In July 2020, the Department of Defense carried out a second test of the JADC2 system. In the course of this exercise, planes from the Air Force communicated with naval vessels that were stationed in the Black Sea. Additionally, special operations personnel from eight other NATO nations and a simulated environment collaborated to deter a possible attack from Russia.

In November 2022 ABMS experiments showed how JADC2 is really § combined arms. —Brig. Gen. Jeffery Valenzia (USAF CFT lead for JADC2)

Infrastructure 

In 2017 a joint network (Joint Enterprise Defense Infrastructure —JEDI) was proposed for DoD, with a single award meant for a single vendor for $10 billion. A competitive bidding was held, and an award was made, but was protested by a competitor. In 2021 the award was cancelled; in its place, multiple vendors for an interoperable, compatible network capability with multiple awards were envisioned, by 2022. This capability (Joint Warfighting Cloud Capability —JWCC) is to be for $9 billion spread among vendors, and is meant to be awarded by mid December 2022. Pentagon network officials began to envision JWCC as a necessary layer for JADC2. In early December 2022 JWCC was awarded to Google, Amazon, Microsoft, and Oracle.

DISA (Defense Information Systems Agency) was embarking on upgrading its JWICS (Joint Worldwide Intelligence Communications System) which is top-secret; DISA was using the same vendors as for JWCC, but also including IBM. Combining the JWICS with JWCC, economies of scale allowed a cooperative project of DISA's JWICS with DoD's JWCC. A Top Secret capability is being sought.

JADC2 Services 

Decision superiority is an objective of CDAO.
By FY2023 other Electromagnetic Battle Management System (EBMS) services will be available in JADC2.
Raytheon BBN demonstrated its Robust Information Provisioning Layer (RIPL) which connects legacy links to ABMS.

The US Army's Integrated Tactical Network (ITN) will support JADC2 as a future capability. Integrated Tactical Network (ITN) Capability Set '25 will implement JADC2, according to the acting head of the Network CFT.

The Air Force's Common Tactical Edge Network joins 9 contractors, exploiting AI. Collins Aerospace demonstrated Combined JADC2 (CJADC2) in July 2022.

This material is split from Army Futures Command

Multi-Domain Operations (MDO); Joint warfighting concept (JADC2) 
Multi-Domain Operations (MDO): Joint planning and operations are also part of the impending DoD emphasis on multi-domain operations.  Multi-domain battalions,   first stood up in 2019, comprise a single unit for air, land, space,—and cyber domains. A hypersonic-based battery similar to a THAAD battery is under consideration for this type of battalion, possibly denoted a strategic fires battalion (however I2CEWS support would likely be needed), depending on the theater. In 2019, as part of a series of globally integrated exercises, these capabilities were analyzed. Using massive simulation the need for a §new kind of command and control (now denoted JADC2) to integrate this firepower was explored.
The ability to punch-through any standoff defense of a near-peer competitor is the goal which Futures Command is seeking. For example, the combination of F-35-based targeting coordinates, Long range precision fires, and Low-earth-orbit satellite capability overmatches the competition, according to Lt. Gen. Wesley. Critical decisions to meet this goal will be decided by data from the results of the Army's ongoing tests of the prototypes under development.
For example, in Long Range Precision Fires (LRPF), the director of the LRPF CFT envisions one application as an anti-access/area denial (A2AD)  probe; this spares resources from the other services; by firing a munition with a thousand-mile range at an adversary, LRPF would force an adversary to respond, which exposes the locations of its countermeasures, and might even expose the location of an adversary force's headquarters. In that situation an adversary's headquarters would not survive for long, and the adversary's forces would be subject to defeat in detail. But LRPF is only one part of the strategy of overmatch by a Combatant commander.
In August–September 2020. at Yuma Proving Ground, the US Army engaged in a five-week exercise to rapidly merge capabilities in multiple-domains. The exercise prototyped a ground tactical Network, pushing it to its limits of robustness (as of 2020, 36 miles on the ground, and demonstrated 1500-mile capability above the ground, with kill chains measured in seconds) in the effort to penetrate anti-access/area denial (A2AD) with long-range fires. Longer-range fires are under development, ranging from hundreds of miles to over 1000 miles, with yearly iterations of Project Convergence being planned. 
 MDO (multi-domain operations) and JADC2 (joint all-domain command and control) thus entails:
 Penetrate phase: satellites detect enemy shooters
 Dis-integrate phase: airborne assets remove enemy long range fires
 Kinetic effect phase: Army shooters, using targeting data from aircraft and other sensors, fire on enemy targets.
 Army Chief of Staff Gen. James C. McConville will discuss the combination of MDO and JADC2 with Air Force Chief of Staff Gen. Charles Q. Brown. In October 2020 the Chiefs agreed that Futures Command, and the Air Force's A5 office will lead a two-year collaboration 'at the most "basic levels" by defining mutual standards for data sharing and service interfacing' in the development of Combined Joint All-Domain Command and Control (CJADC2).
 The ability of the joint services to send data from machine to machine was exercised in front of several of the Joint Chiefs of Staff in April 2021; this is a prerequisite capability for Convergence of MDO and JADC2.
 In July 2022 the 7th ASA(ALT) Doug Bush called for the formation of a large office on the scale of the Joint Counter-small UAS office, but for JADC2. This would coordinate, and eventually reconcile requirements for JADC2 for Army’s Project Convergence, the Navy’s Project Overmatch and the Air Force’s Advanced Battle Management System. See CDAO

Notes and References 

Military strategy
Military technology